Sir William Howard (c. 1599 – by 7 August 1672) of Tollesbury Hall, Essex was an English courtier and a member of Parliament between 1624 and 1640.

He was the 4th surviving son of Thomas Howard, 1st Earl of Suffolk by his 2nd wife. He was created a Knight of the Bath in 1616.

He became a gentleman of the privy chamber in Prince Charles's, later Charles I's, household in 1623 and a lieutenant in the band of gentleman pensioners from 1639 to at least 1642.

He sat for Cricklade in the parliaments of 1624, 1625 and 1626 and became the member for Old Sarum in the Short Parliament in April 1640.

References 

1590s births
1672 deaths
Members of the Parliament of England (pre-1707) for Cricklade
Members of the Parliament of England (pre-1707) for Old Sarum
English MPs 1624–1625
English MPs 1625
English MPs 1626
English MPs 1640 (April)
Knights of the Bath
Younger sons of earls
People from Essex